Chinnathambi Thevar was an Indian politician and former Member of the Legislative Assembly. He was elected to the Tamil Nadu legislative assembly as an Indian National Congress candidate from Alangulam constituency in 1952 election.

Electoral performance

References 

Indian National Congress politicians from Tamil Nadu
Possibly living people
Year of birth missing
Place of birth missing
Madras MLAs 1952–1957